Domhnall Glas Ó Curnín (died 1519) was an Irish poet.

Ó Curnín was a member of a brehon literary family of the Kingdom of Breifne.

The Annals of the Four Masters record his death, sub anno 1519:

 Domhnall Glas Ó Curnín ... died.

See also

 Cormac Ó Curnín, died 1474
 Ruaidrí Ó Curnín, died 1496
 Conor Carragh Ó Curnín, died 1519

References
 http://www.ucc.ie/celt/published/T100005D/
 http://www.irishtimes.com/ancestor/surname/index.cfm?fuseaction=Go.&UserID=

Medieval Irish poets
People from County Leitrim
16th-century Irish writers
1519 deaths
Year of birth unknown
16th-century Irish poets
Irish male poets